Jan Zybert (11 March 1908 – 1943) was a Polish cyclist. He competed in the team pursuit event at the 1928 Summer Olympics. Drafted into the German Wehrmacht, he was allegedly killed on the Eastern Front during World War II.

References

External links
 

1908 births
1943 deaths
Polish male cyclists
Olympic cyclists of Poland
Cyclists at the 1928 Summer Olympics
Sportspeople from Łódź
People from Piotrków Governorate
German military personnel killed in World War II